In economics, the debt-to-GDP ratio is the ratio between a country's government debt (measured in units of currency) and its gross domestic product (GDP) (measured in units of currency per year). A low debt-to-GDP ratio indicates that an economy produces goods and services sufficient to pay back debts without incurring further debt. Geopolitical and economic considerations – including interest rates, war, recessions, and other variables – influence the borrowing practices of a nation and the choice to incur further debt.

It should not be confused with a deficit-to-GDP ratio, which, for countries running budget deficits, measures a country's annual net fiscal loss in a given year (total expenditures minus total revenue, or the net change in debt per annum) as a percentage share of that country's GDP; for countries running budget surpluses, a surplus-to-GDP ratio measures a country's annual net fiscal gain as a share of that country's GDP.

Particularly in macroeconomics, various debt-to-GDP ratios can be calculated. The most commonly used ratio is the government debt divided by the gross domestic product (GDP), which reflects the government's finances, while another common ratio is the total debt to GDP, which reflects the finances of the nation as a whole.

The debt-to-GDP ratio is technically not a dimensionless constant, but a unit of time, being equal to the amount of years over which the accumulated economic product equals the debt.

Changes 
The change in debt-to-GDP is approximately "net change in debt as percentage of GDP"; for government debt, this is deficit or (surplus) as percentage of GDP.

This is only approximate as GDP changes from year to year, but generally, year-on-year GDP changes are small (say, 3%), and thus this is approximately correct.

However, in the presence of significant inflation, or particularly hyperinflation, GDP may increase rapidly in nominal terms; if debt is nominal, then its ratio to GDP will decrease rapidly.  A period of deflation would have the opposite effect.

A government's debt-to-GDP ratio can be analysed by looking at how it changes or, in other words, how the debt is evolving over time:

Hence, the left side of the equation shows the change in the debt-to-GDP ratio. The right hand side of the equation shows the causes of the government's debt.  is the interest payments on the stock of debt as a ratio of GDP so far, and  shows the primary deficit-to-GDP ratio.

If the government has the ability to print money, and therefore monetize the outstanding debt, the budget constraint becomes:

The term  is the change in money balances (i.e. money growth). By printing money the government is able to increase nominal money balances to pay off the debt (consequently acting in the debt way that debt financing does, in order to balance the government's expenditures). However, the effect that an increase in nominal money balances has on seignorage is ambiguous, as while it increases the amount of money within the economy, the real value of each unit of money decreases due to inflationary effects. This inflationary effect from money printing is called an inflation tax.

Applications 
Debt-to-GDP measures the financial leverage of an economy.

One of the Euro convergence criteria was that government debt-to-GDP should be below 60%.

The World Bank and the IMF hold that "a country can be said to achieve external debt sustainability if it can meet its current and future external debt service obligations in full, without recourse to debt rescheduling or the accumulation of arrears and without compromising growth". According to these two institutions, external debt sustainability can be obtained by a country "by bringing the net present value (NPV) of external public debt down to about 150 percent of a country's exports or 250 percent of a country's revenues". High external debt is believed to have harmful effects on an economy. The United Nations Sustainable Development Goal 17, an integral part of the 2030 Agenda has a target to address the external debt of highly indebted poor countries to reduce debt distress.

In 2013 Herndon, Ash, and Pollin reviewed an influential, widely cited research paper entitled, "Growth in a Time of Debt", by two Harvard economists Carmen Reinhart and Kenneth Rogoff. Herndon, Ash and Pollin argued that "coding errors, selective exclusion of available data, and unconventional weighting of summary statistics lead to serious errors that inaccurately represent the relationship between public debt and GDP growth among 20 advanced economies in the post-war period". Correcting these basic computational errors undermined the central claim of the book that too much debt causes recession. Rogoff and Reinhardt claimed that their fundamental conclusions were accurate, despite the errors.

There is a difference between external debt denominated in domestic currency, and external debt denominated in foreign currency. A nation can service external debt denominated in domestic currency by tax revenues, but to service foreign currency debt it has to convert tax revenues in the foreign exchange market to foreign currency, which puts downward pressure on the value of its currency.

Global statistics 

At the end of the 1st quarter of 2021, the United States public debt-to-GDP ratio was 127.5%.
According to the IMF World Economic Outlook Database (April 2021), the level of Gross Government debt-to-GDP ratio in Canada was 116.3%, in China 66.8%, in India 89.6%, in Germany 70.3%, in France 115.2% and in the United States 132.8%.

Two-thirds of US public debt is owned by US citizens, banks, corporations, and the Federal Reserve Bank; approximately one-third of US public debt is held by foreign countries – particularly China and Japan. In comparison, less than 5% of Italian and Japanese public debt is held by foreign countries.

See also
 Economic bubble
 Debt levels and flows
 Debt ratio, for companies
 Debt-to-income ratio, for households
 Leverage (finance)
 List of countries by public debt
 List of countries by external debt
 List of sovereign states by tax revenue to GDP ratio

References

Debt-to-GDP ratio